Samaale, also spelled Samali or Samale is traditionally considered to be the oldest common forefather of several major Somali clans and their respective sub-clans. His name is the source of the ethnonym Somali.

As the purported ancestor of most pastoralist clans living in the northern part of Somalia, Samaale lies at the basis of the largest and most widespread Somali lineage (the second largest lineage belonging to Samaale's brother Sab, the purported progenitor of most southern, cultivating clans). The main branches of the Samaale clan are the Dir, the Hawiye, the Isaaq, the Darod, and the 'pre-Hawiya' group (containing the Gardere, the Yakabur, and the Mayle).

Both the Samaale and the Sab claim to be ultimately descended from the Arab clan of the Quraysh through Aqil ibn Abi Talib, a cousin of the Islamic prophet Muhammad and an older brother of Ali, but this is historically untenable.

History 
The progenitor Samaale is generally regarded as the source of the ethnonym Somali.  Other state the word Somali is derived from the words soo and maal, which together mean "go and milk"—a reference to the ubiquitous pastoralism of the Somali people. Another etymology proposes that the term Somali is derived from the Arabic for "wealthy" (zāwamāl), again referring to Somali riches in livestock.

Just like the descendants of the other main Somali clan progenitor Sab, the clans tracing their lineage to Samaale claim that their forefather was himself a descendant of the Arab Banu Hashim clan (a sub-clan of the Quraysh), through Aqil ibn Abi Talib, a cousin of the Islamic prophet Muhammad and an older brother of Ali. According to the British anthropologist and Somali Studies veteran Ioan M. Lewis, the traditions of descent from noble Arab families related to Muhammad embraced by most Somali clans are most probably figurative expressions of the importance of Islam in Somali society.

The paternal genetics of ethnic Somalis are inconsistent with a post-Islamic common TMRCA (time to most recent common ancestor) and with a post-Islamic paternal Arabian origin for the majority of the ethnicity. The majority of Somalis have a TMRCA between 4,000-2,000 years before present in the Bronze Age.

Genealogy 
The claimed descent of Samaale from the Banu Hashim, a sub-clan of the Meccan tribe of the Quraysh is represented as follows: Samaale was the son of Hill, the son of Muhammad Yow, the son of Muhammad Abd al-Rahman, the son of Aqil, the son of Abu Talib (paternal uncle of the prophet Muhammad), the son of Abd al-Muttalib (paternal grandfather of the prophet Muhammad). Samaale's father Hill is also thought of as the father of Sab, the progenitor of most southern Somali clans (most notably the Rahanweyn).

Constructing and reconstructing genealogical tables according to changing political and economical alliances is an important part of Somali culture, epitomized by the saying tol waa tolane, meaning 'clan is something joined together'. One of multiple possible tables used by scholars as basis for the main outlines of Somali clan genealogy is as follows:

Hill
Samaale
Irir
Dir
Gadabursi
Issa
Samaroon
Bimaal
Isaaq
Habr Magaadleeh
Garhaji
Awal
Habr Habusheed
Habr Yunis
Tol Ja'lo (Ahmed)
Hawiye
Gurreh
Ajuran
Mobilen
Habr Gedir
Sheikhaal
Abgaal
Gardere–Yakabur–Mayle
Darod
Ogadeen
Harti
Majeerteen
Warsangeli
Dhulbahante
Marehan
Sab (non-Samaale)
Digil
Tunni
Rahanweyn
Siyyeed
Sagaal

See also 
 Demographics of Somalia

References

Works cited

Somali clans